Arthur Fairbanks (November 13, 1864 Hanover, New Hampshire – January 13, 1944 Cambridge, Massachusetts) was an art historian and administrator who lived and worked in the United States.  From 1908 to 1925, he was director of the Museum of Fine Arts, Boston.

Biography
He graduated from Dartmouth College in 1886 and attended the Yale Divinity School and the Union Theological Seminary. He also studied in Germany, receiving a Ph.D. from the University of Freiburg in 1890. He was on the faculty of Dartmouth College and Yale and Cornell Universities until 1900, when he became professor of Greek literature and archaeology at the University of Iowa. In 1906, he was appointed professor of Greek and Greek archaeology in the University of Michigan. He was appointed curator of classical art at the Boston Museum of Fine Arts in 1907, and in 1908 became director there.  He supervised the museum's move to its current Fenway location.  He retired in 1925.  He was a member of many classical and learned societies.

Works
 Introduction to Sociology (1896)
 The Mythology of Greece and Rome (1907)
 Handbook of Greek Religion (1910)
 Greek Gods and Heroes (1915)

Notes

Attribution

References

External links
 
 
 
 

1864 births
1944 deaths
American art historians
Directors of museums in the United States
Museum of Fine Arts, Boston
Dartmouth College alumni
Yale Divinity School alumni
Union Theological Seminary (New York City) alumni
University of Freiburg alumni
University of Iowa faculty
University of Michigan faculty
19th-century American historians
19th-century American male writers
20th-century American historians
American male non-fiction writers